Auca or AUCA may refer to :

 Auca (titular diocese), the former Catholic bishopric of (Villafranca Montes de) Oca in Spain, now a Latin titular see
 A pejorative name for the native Huaorani people in Ecuador
 Operation Auca, an endeavor to evangelize the Huaorani tribe
 Auca (genus), a genus of butterflies in the subfamily Satyrinae of the family Nymphalidae
 Auca (cartoon), a Catalan genre of story in pictures
 Sociedad Deportiva Aucas, a football club from Quito, Ecuador

 AUCA as an acronym 
 Adventist University of Central Africa
 American University of Central Asia